This is a list of airports, airfields and aerodromes in the Republic of Ireland, grouped by type and sorted by location.



Airports 
Airport names shown in bold indicate the airport has scheduled service on commercial airlines.

See also 

 Irish Aviation Authority
 Transport in Ireland
 List of airports by ICAO code: E#EI - Ireland
 List of Airports in Northern Ireland

References
 Irish Aviation Authority
 Integrated Aeronautical Information Package (IAIP). Aeronautical Information Service. Effective 2008.
 
 
  – includes IATA codes
  – IATA and ICAO codes

Footnotes

Ireland, Republic of
 
Airports
Airports
Ireland